Gregg Lennon is an Australian former professional rugby league footballer who played in the 1980s.

Playing career
Gregg Lennon made his début for Wakefield Trinity during September 1987, and he played his last match for Wakefield Trinity during the 1987–88 season.

References

External links
Statistics at stats.rleague.com

Living people
North Sydney Bears players
Place of birth missing (living people)
Wakefield Trinity players
Year of birth missing (living people)
Rugby league wingers
Australian rugby league players